Tennessee House of Representatives 92nd district in the United States is one of 99 legislative districts included in the lower house of the Tennessee Legislature. It covers all of Marshall County, parts of Franklin County, Marion County, and Lincoln County.

Demographics
88.2% of the district is Caucasian
4.4% of the district is African-American
3.6% of the district is Hispanic
0.5% of the district is Asian-American
2.1% is mixed

Representatives

Elections

2020

2018

References

Tennessee House of Representatives districts